The Revised Trauma Score (RTS) is a physiologic scoring system based on the initial vital signs of a patient. A lower score indicates a higher severity of injury.

Use in triage

The Revised Trauma Score is made up of three categories: Glasgow Coma Scale, systolic blood pressure, and respiratory rate. The score range is 0–12.  In START triage, a patient with an RTS score of 12 is labeled delayed, 11 is urgent, and 3–10 is immediate. Those who have an RTS below 3 are declared dead and should not receive certain care because they are highly unlikely to survive without a significant amount of resources.

Scoring
The score is as follows:

These three scores (Glasgow Coma Scale, Systolic Blood Pressure, Respiratory Rate) are then used to take the weighted sum by RTS = 0.9368 GCS + 0.7326 SBP + 0.2908 RR. Values for the RTS are in the range 0 to 7.8408. The RTS is heavily weighted towards the Glasgow Coma Scale to compensate for major head injury without multisystem injury or major physiological changes. A threshold of RTS > 4 has been proposed to identify those patients who should be treated in a trauma centre, although this value may be somewhat low.

References

External links
Online Calculator of the Revised Trauma Score

Diagnostic emergency medicine
Medical scales
Medical assessment and evaluation instruments
Orthopedic clinical prediction rules
Triage